Irma Heijting-Schuhmacher (24 February 1925 – 8 January 2014) was a freestyle swimmer from the Netherlands who won two medals at the Summer Olympics. After having claimed the bronze medal in the 4 × 100 m freestyle relay in London (1948), she won the silver medal four years later in Helsinki, Finland, in the same event. Individually, she was sixth in the 100 m freestyle at both games. She also won two gold and two silver medals at the 1947 and 1950 European Championships.

In 1950, while touring Australia with Geertje Wielema, Schuhmacher met Johan Heijting, a Dutch animal husbandry specialist who had recently immigrated to Australia. They married on 22 March 1952, and one week after the 1952 Olympics, Heijting-Schuhmacher moved to her husband's breeding farm near Brisbane.

References

1925 births
2014 deaths
Dutch female freestyle swimmers
Swimmers at the 1948 Summer Olympics
Swimmers at the 1952 Summer Olympics
Olympic swimmers of the Netherlands
Olympic silver medalists for the Netherlands
Olympic bronze medalists for the Netherlands
Sportspeople from Breda
Olympic bronze medalists in swimming
Medalists at the 1948 Summer Olympics
Medalists at the 1952 Summer Olympics
European Aquatics Championships medalists in swimming
Olympic silver medalists in swimming
20th-century Dutch women
21st-century Dutch women